The Communauté de communes du Bosc d’Eawy  was located in the Seine-Maritime département of the Normandy region of northern France. It was created on 1 January 2002. It was dissolved on 1 January 2017.

Participants 
The Communauté de communes comprised the following communes:

Ardouval
Beaumont-le-Hareng
Bellencombre
Bosc-le-Hard
Bracquetuit
Cottévrard
Cressy
La Crique
Cropus
Les Grandes-Ventes
Grigneuseville
Mesnil-Follemprise
Pommeréval
Rosay
Saint-Hellier

See also
Communes of the Seine-Maritime department

References 

Bosc d'Eawy